Faulkner Brook flows into the West Branch Delaware River by Balls Eddy, Pennsylvania.

References

Rivers of Pennsylvania
Rivers of Wayne County, Pennsylvania
Tributaries of the West Branch Delaware River